= Wanderer: War Song =

2013 video game

- Developer: WSITech
- Publisher: WSITech
- Platform: iOS
- Release: February 17, 2013
- Genre: Adventure

Wanderer: War Song is an iOS adventure game developed by Chinese studio WSITech and released on February 17, 2013.

== Critical reception ==
The game has a mixed response, garnering a rating of 40% on Metacritic based on 4 critic reviews.

148Apps wrote "Wanderer: War Song is the kind of game I want to like, but it goes to great lengths to keep me from doing so. The controls are a mess, the hitboxes need adjusting, and getting booted back to the main menu after each level is a pain. I'd say wait for an update or two before investing any money here", while TouchGen said "The developers of Wanderer shouldn't have expected the virtual joypad to work, and it doesn't. All of the art and fancy lighting in the game don't make up for the fact that it is a highly simplistic arena brawler with shoddy controls". Gamezebo said "The poor performance of the controls as a whole ties a neat bow around this muddled mess of a game", while Pocket Gamer UK wrote "Gorgeous graphics and a desperate desire to be like Monster Hunter don't compensate for simple gameplay and clunky controls".
